Muhammad Haziq bin Ridwan (born 11 January 1996) is a Malaysian footballer who plays as a goalkeeper.

Club career

Early year
Born in Selangor, he played junior football in Selangor under-19 from 2013 to 2015, before joining under-21 squad in 2016. He also was one of the players representing the Selangor football in sporting events (Sukma) in Sarawak.

Selangor
During the 2017 season, he played regularly for Selangor President Cup team and made 18 appearances, helping them to win a President Cup title. On 27 November 2017, Selangor under-21 manager, Ariffin Ab Hamid confirmed that Haziq would be definitely promoted to Selangor's first team for 2018 season.

Career statistics

Club

Honours

Club
Selangor
 President Cup (1): 2017

References

External links

1996 births
Living people
Malaysian footballers
Selangor FA players
Malaysia Super League players
Malaysian people of Indian descent
People from Negeri Sembilan
Association football wingers
Association football forwards